Archie Comics is an American comic book company.

A

B

C

D

E

F

G

H

J

K

L

M

N

O

P

R

S

T

V

W

Y

Z

External links

Archie Comics at the Big Comic Book DataBase

 
Archie Comics publications